Lennart Steffensen (born 12 July 1977) is a retired Norwegian football midfielder.

He was drafted into the senior squad of Skeid Fotball in late 1996. He played for the Norwegian under-21 team, and ahead of the 2000 season he joined Stabæk Fotball. However, he did not play regularly. As early as August 2000 he was shipped to Vålerenga Fotball. He played there until the spring of 2002, when he was loaned out to Hønefoss BK. The move was made permanent ahead of the 2003 season. Ahead of the 2006 season he went to Notodden FK. In August 2009 he was sold back to Hønefoss BK.

After a lengthy spell in Jevnaker IF, he joined Hønefoss for the third time ahead of the 2016 season. This was his last active season.

References

1977 births
Living people
Norwegian footballers
Norway under-21 international footballers
Skeid Fotball players
Stabæk Fotball players
Vålerenga Fotball players
Notodden FK players
Hønefoss BK players
Jevnaker IF players
Eliteserien players
Norwegian First Division players
Association football midfielders
Footballers from Oslo